The Mysterious City is a 1988 Cambodian-North Korean film directed by Norodom Sihanouk, former King of Cambodia. The film tells the story of a Cambodian archaeologist setting out to find a mysterious temple discovered by a woodcutter within the Dângrêk Mountains.

It is Sihanouk's first among four films to be shot in North Korea.

Cast
Kim Weun as Prince Indra-Putra, an archaeologist
Sin Myeung-ouk as Lieutenant Rithy
Jang Seun-hi as Queen Shiva-Putri
Yu Won-joun as General Brahma-Sena
Hwang Hak-youn as Sok, a woodcutter

Production
Filming began in May 1988 and ended in June the same year.

References

External links

1988 films
Cambodian drama films
Films set in Cambodia
Films set in the 1950s
Films shot in North Korea
North Korean drama films